Shirin Kandi (also Romanized as Shīrīn Kandī; also known as Shīrīn Kandī-ye Jadīd) is a village in Qarah Su Rural District, in the Central District of Khoy County, West Azerbaijan Province, Iran. At the 2006 census, its population was 505, in 112 families.

References 

Populated places in Khoy County